The women's 500 metres at the 1999 Asian Winter Games was held on 2 and 3 February 1999 in Chuncheon, South Korea.

Schedule
All times are Korea Standard Time (UTC+09:00)

Records

500 meters

500 meters × 2

Results

References
Results
Results

External links
Official website

Women 500
Asia